The Lumineers is the debut studio album by American folk rock band the Lumineers. The album was released in the United States on April 3, 2012, and contains the singles "Ho Hey", "Stubborn Love" and "Submarines". The album peaked at number 2 on the Billboard 200 chart.

The vinyl LP version of the record was pressed by United Record Pressing in Nashville, Tennessee.

Reception

Commercial

The Lumineers debuted on the US Billboard 200 at number 45 on its week of release with sales of 10,000. The success of the song "Ho Hey" however began to drive sales of the album, and it eventually reached a peak of number 2 on the Billboard 200. The album sold 1,700,000 copies in the US as of April 2016.

The album debuted and peaked at number 8 on the UK Albums Chart. It sold 421,177 copies in the UK as of April 2016.

Critical

The Lumineers by The Lumineers received mostly positive reviews. At Metacritic, which assigns a normalized rating out of 100 to reviews from mainstream critics, the album received an average score of 73, based on 9 reviews, which indicates "generally favorable reviews". The album garnered both positive and mixed ratings from critics. To this, the positive reviews are from AllMusic, The Austin Chronicle, Digital Spy, Irish Times, The New Zealand Herald, Paste and Uncut magazine. On the other hand, the mixed reviews came from The Guardian, The Observer and Rolling Stone magazine.

Steve Leggett of AllMusic believed that "each track is inventive". To this, Joe Breen of the Irish Times said the music needs to be communal because it is essential to the collective and joint mission between the band and the fans, which is "underlined by elemental instrumentation – guitar, cello and drums; in the manner in which songs of call and response become sites of collaboration and celebration; in the vernacularity of the thoughtful lyrics." Lydia Jenkin of The New Zealand Herald said that the music is enjoyable, but the music is even more so entertaining "live (when they rope in further players to help fill out the many layers of piano, drums, percussion, and guitars)." Alexandra Fletcher of Paste proclaimed that the "record is instantly gratifying—and not in the hasty, shallow way often found in pre-fab pop songs either."

Melanie Haupt of The Austin Chronicle found the release to be "uniquely American in all the best ways: gritty, determined, soaked in sweat and love and drive." Similarly, Graeme Thomson of Uncut called it "primal, pounding folk music", and he found that it was facilitated with a subdued amount of "drama." Lastly, Thomson proclaimed that "Nothing is overcooked," which means the sound can readily and "easily [be] recreated by the band on some makeshift stage." Conversely, Phil Mongredien of The Observer faulted the album because the "songs float prettily", which does not create an impression because the band produced "gossamer-light and gossamer-memorable" music. In agreement, Will Hermes of Rolling Stone told that the music here "basically argues that a bunch of Americans can lead slowly-accelerating lovelorn singalongs just as well as UK yankophile Marcus Mumford, bringing fiddle scratching, marching-band snare rolls, parlor-room piano chords, and Kingston Trio guitar strumming to an album that's long on nostalgic reverie." But, Robert Copsey of Digital Spy vowed that "they've still got plenty more to get off their chest", so this album gives them the potential to get that done.

Cover art
According to Wesley Schultz, the album's cover art is a childhood photograph of Schultz's mother Judy and her mother, Schultz's grandmother.

Track listing

Personnel
The Lumineers
 Wesley Schultz – vocals, guitar, keyboards, drums, percussion, ukulele and effects
 Jeremiah Fraites – vocals, drums, percussion, guitar and mandolin
 Neyla Pekarek – vocals, cello, keyboards, mandolin, accordion, drums, percussion
 Stelth Ulvang – keyboards, guitar, accordion, mandolin, bouzouki, vocals
 Ben Wahamaki – electric bass, vocals

Additional musicians
 Adam Trachsel – electric bass, upright bass
 Lauren Jacobson – violin
 All the Lumineers and their Friends – group vocals, stomps, hand claps

Charts

Weekly charts

Year-end charts

Decade-end charts

Certifications

Release history

References

2012 debut albums
The Lumineers albums
Dualtone Records albums